Kimmo Ilpo Juhani Laiho (born 1981), better known by his stage name Elastinen (meaning elastic in Finnish), is a Finnish rap musician and also known as one of the founders and is the CEO of the Finnish independent rap label Rähinä Records. Together with his colleague Iso H (Big H), he founded the Finnish rap duo Fintelligens. He has also released five solo albums.

Biography

Beginnings
Born and raised in Helsinki, Elastinen began taking guitar lessons when he was seven years old. At the age of 11 he started dancing and has been a member of famous break-dance groups as IMC and Savage Feet. Inspired by a hiphop-cassette, given by his elder-brother, "Ela" wrote his first rap-lyrics when he was 15. He joined an anti-racist musical "Colorblind" and met Iso H.

In Fintelligens

In summer 1997, Elastinen and Iso H founded Fintelligens. Elastinen was only 18 when they got their first record-deal.

Ela graduated from Sibelius Academy, a music school in 2000. Same year Fintelligens released debut album "Renesanssi" with one-third produced by Elastinen. Renesanssi certified gold. In autumn 2001, Elastinen and Iso H released their second album, Tän Tahtiin. Also partly produced by him, it was in its turned certified gold.

Elastinen was then called in 2002 to do his military service at Santahamina. But he used his freetime performing shows with Iso H. Fintelligens released third studio album in November. Kokemusten Summa went gold. The album was entirely produced by Elastinen.

Solo career
In 2004 Elastinen released his solo debut "Elaksis Kivi". In 2006 he finished his second album Anna Soida. The first single, the album's title track, was a hit. "Anna a" was released in 2006. His third album, E.L.A., was released in November 2007. First single from the album, "Ovet Paukkuu", was No. 1 on NRJ-Finland and had heavy rotation also on Finnish MTV and The Voice. He followed this with Joka päivä koko päivä in 2013, which peaked at number 4, and Elastinen feat. in 2016, which debuted at number 1. Elastinen feat. was preceded by a TV series featuring Elastinen collaborating with a different musician each episode.

Discography 
(For Elastinen discography with his band / duo Fintelligens, see Fintelligens)

Albums

Singles 

Other songs

Featured in

References

External links 

 Royal Artist Club – Official Mobile Blog
 MySpace site
 [http://www.rahina.com Record Label Rähinä Records
 [ All music] short biography.

1981 births
Living people
Finnish rappers
Musicians from Helsinki
Finnish hip hop record producers